George Georgallidis (born June 23, 1990), better known by his in-game name HotshotGG, is the founder, owner of, and a former player for Counter Logic Gaming, a professional esports organization.

Biography 
George Georgallidis founded Counter Logic Gaming in April 2010. Georgallidis has since led the organization's teams to success across multiple esports titles, including League of Legends, Counter-Strike: Global Offensive, Halo, and Super Smash Bros.. Following the 2013 NA LCS Spring Split, George stepped down as a player to take a managerial role in the team. He was replaced with Nientonsoh on May 26, 2013.

Tournament results

Counter Logic Gaming 
 1st — 2010 World Cyber Games Grand Finals
 3rd — 2011 World Cyber Games Grand Finals
 2nd — MLG 2012 - Spring Championship

References 

Counter Logic Gaming
Counter Logic Gaming players
Living people
Canadian expatriates in the United States
League of Legends top lane players
League of Legends mid lane players
Canadian people of Greek descent
Esports team owners
1990 births
Canadian esports players